Organ grinder usually refers to a street organ player. It may also refer to:

Film and TV
The Organ Grinder, 1912 film short with Carlyle Blackwell Alice Joyce and William H. West  
The Organ Grinder, 1933 Looney Tunes and Merrie Melodies filmography (1929–39)
Organ Grinder, CSI TV episode
Organ Grinder, Grimm TV episode

Music
"Organ Grinder", song by Gene Page from the Lovelock album, 1976
"Organ Grinder", song by Emilie Autumn from 4 O'Clock

Other
The Organ Grinder Restaurant was a "pipes and pizza" location in Portland, Oregon from 1973 to 1996.

See also

Organ Grinder Swing, album
Organ Grinder's Swing, Popeye the Sailor filmography (Fleischer Studios)
Organ Grinder's Swing, 1936 song